16th Street Bridge may refer to:

16th Street Bridge (Pittsburgh) in Pennsylvania
16th Street Bridge (Sacramento) in California, see California State Route 160
16th Street Bridge (Washington, D.C.)